The 2018 New York Excelsior season was the first season of New York Excelsior's existence in the Overwatch League. The team finished the league-leading regular season record of 34–6.

New York qualified for all four of the Stage Playoffs. The team lost in the Stage 1 finals to the London Spitfire, won in the Stage 2 finals against Philadelphia Fusion, won in the Stage 3 finals against Boston Uprising, and lost in the Stage 4 finals against the Los Angeles Valiant. The team also qualified for the Season Playoffs, but lost to the Philadelphia Fusion in the semifinals.

Preceding offseason 
On October 30, 2017, New York Excelsior unveiled their inaugural season roster, consisting of the following players:
Hong "Ark" Yeon-jun
Song "Janus" Jun-Hwa
Bang "JJonak" Seong-hyun
Kim "Libero" Hae-seong
Kim "Mano" Dong-gyu
Kim "MekO" Tae-hong
Kim "Pine" Do-hyeon
Park "Saebyeolbe" Jong-ryeol

The team also announced the signings of coaches Yu "Pavane" Hyeon-sang and Kim "WizardHyeong" Hyeong-seok, and Meta Athena's Kim "Libero" Hae-seong.

Review 
On January 11, the Excelsior played their first regular season Overwatch League match in a 3–1 victory over the Boston Uprising. They would end Stage 1 of the 2018 Season with a  record, earning them the top spot and first-round bye in the Stage 1 Playoffs. However, the team lost in the finals to the London Spitfire (3–2) in a reverse sweep.

Stage 2 played out much like Stage 1 for New York, as the team went on to post again a 9–1 record and a first-round bye into the Stage 2 Playoffs. Also like Stage 1, the playoff finals ended in a 3–2 reverse sweep, but this time New York was on the winning side, defeating the Philadelphia Fusion on March 25 to claim the Stage 2.

In Stage 3, New York once again posted a 9–1 record, giving them the second seed for the Stage 3 Playoffs. In the semifinals, the Excelsior swept the Los Angeles Valiant 3–0. The team won in the Stage 3 finals against Boston Uprising in another 3–0 sweep, giving New York back-to-back stage titles.

New York posted their worst record (7–3) in Stage 4, but still claimed the third seed for the Stage 4 Playoffs. Their first matchup was in the semifinals against the Dallas Fuel, in which the Excelsior won 3–2. However, they lost in the Stage 4 finals against the Los Angeles Valiant by a score of 1–3.

New York ended their season with a league-leading 34–6 record and qualified for the Season Playoffs prior to the beginning of Stage 4. The team had a first-round bye and faced the Philadelphia Fusion in the semifinals on July 18 and 21. New York lost both matchups by scores of 0–3 and 2–3, eliminating them from the playoffs.

On July 11, 2018, Blizzard officially named support player Bang "JJonak" Seong-hyun the inaugural Overwatch League season MVP.

Final roster

Transactions 
Transactions of/for players on the roster during the 2018 regular season:
On March 30, Excelsior signed Jung "Anamo" Tae-sung.

Standings

Record by stage

League

Game log

Preseason

Regular season

Playoffs

References 

2018 Overwatch League seasons by team
New York Excelsior
New York Excelsior seasons